Okan Derici (born April 16, 1993) is a Turkish footballer who plays for Denizlispor.

International career
Derici represented Turkey at the 2010 UEFA European Under-17 Football Championship.

External links
 
 
 
 

1993 births
Living people
German people of Turkish descent
Turkish footballers
German footballers
Germany youth international footballers
Galatasaray S.K. footballers
FC Rot-Weiß Erfurt players
Konyaspor footballers
Denizlispor footballers
Turkey youth international footballers
3. Liga players
Süper Lig players
Association football midfielders
Ümraniyespor footballers